Aavo Põhjala (born 1 August 1957 in Tartu) is an Estonian judoka and judoka coach.

In 1980 he graduated from Tartu State University in physical education.

1974-1986 he become 14-times Estonian champion in different judo weight categories.

Since 1980 he worked as a judoka coach. 1984-2013 he was the principal coach of Estonian national judoka team.

Students: Indrek Pertelson, Aleksei Budõlin, Dmitri Budõlin, Martin Padar.

Since 2014 he is the president of Estonian Judo Federation.

Awards:
 several times Estonian Judoka of the Year
 2000: Estonian Coach of the Year
 2001: Order of the Estonian Red Cross, IV class.

References

Living people
1957 births
Estonian male judoka
Estonian sambo practitioners
Estonian sports coaches
University of Tartu alumni
Sportspeople from Tartu